Glaucestrilda is a genus of estrildid finch in the family Estrildidae. The genus is found in Africa.

Species
It contains the following species:

See also

References

 

 
Waxbills
Bird genera